Falcatifolium is a genus of conifers of the family Podocarpaceae. Five species are presently recognized. The genus was first described by de Laubenfels in 1969, and is composed of species formerly classified in genus Dacrydium.

Genus Facatifolium ranges from New Caledonia to the Malay Peninsula, including New Guinea, the Indonesian islands of Sulawesi, Borneo, and the Obi and Riau Islands, and the Philippine island of Mindoro.

Falcatifolium taxoides from New Caledonia is the exclusive host of the Parasitaxus usta, the only known parasitic gymnosperm.

References

de Laubenfels, David J. 1969. A revision of the Malesian and Pacific rainforest conifers, I. Podocarpaceae, in part. Journal of the Arnold Arboretum 50:274-314. 
de Laubenfels, David J. 1988. Coniferales. P. 337–453 in Flora Malesiana, Series I, Vol. 10. Dordrecht: Kluwer Academic.
de Laubenfels, D. J. 1959. Parasitic conifer found in New Caledonia. Science, 130(3367), 97–97.

Podocarpaceae
Podocarpaceae genera
Dioecious plants
Taxa named by David John de Laubenfels